Sheikh Umar bin Bagharib Ali is a Malaysian politician who served as Member of the Johor State Executive Council (EXCO) in the Pakatan Harapan (PH) state administration under former Menteris Besar Osman Sapian and Sahruddin Jamal from May 2018 to the collapse of the PH state administration in February 2020. He also served as Member of the Johor State Legislative Assembly (MLA) for Paloh from May 2018 to March 2022. He is a member of the Democratic Action Party (DAP), a component party of the PH opposition coalition.

Election results

References 

Living people
People from Johor
Malaysian people of Malay descent
Democratic Action Party (Malaysia) politicians
21st-century Malaysian politicians
Members of the Johor State Legislative Assembly
Johor state executive councillors
1985 births